The Riga Marathon (also known as the Rimi Riga Marathon) is an annual road marathon held in Riga, Latvia, since 1991. A flat, single-lap marathon course in the Baltics' largest city. The marathon course has been measured and certified by AIMS, the Association of International Marathons and Distance Races and is categorized as a Gold Label Road Race by World Athletics. All courses are traffic-free. Rimi Riga Marathon is one of the fastest-growing marathons in Northern Europe. In 2019, there were 25 659 participants over five different distances from 82 countries.

The marathon starts and finishes near Riga Castle, and runs through Old Riga as well as across the Daugava River. In the marathon weekend it is also possible to run 42,195 kilometer distance, 21,095 kilometer half marathon, 10 kilometer, 5 kilometer and mile course distances.

History 

For the first time, Latvian athletes competed in the marathon distance at the 1912 Olympic Games in Stockholm, but the first marathon competition in Latvia took place 15 years later in Liepāja. The popularity of marathon running continued to grow in the 1970s, reaching its heyday in the late 1980s. The Folk Song Marathon (1988 – 1990) gathered several thousand runners during the revival, of which 250 - 300 finished at a distance of 42 km.

The start of Riga Marathon history 
The first start shot of the Riga Marathon was fired at the Freedom Monument on July 27, 1991, shortly after the time of the barricades, when the capital city was shaken by OMON shots. Then this marathon was called the Riga International Marathon. The participants of this marathon were provided with both grand cash prizes (1000 German Marks for the first place winners), a pennant, and the then exotic fruit - banana - at the finish line.

The track was measured according to the international standards of the time, using a 50 m-long measuring tape and pegs. 735 participants took part in the first Riga Marathon, a third of which were local runners, around 30 representatives of Western countries, and the rest from the USSR.

However, in the next few years after the successful start, the number of participants in the Riga Marathon rapidly decreased. Runners from the Eastern Bloc were deterred from participating by the new visa regime, while Westerners might find the trip to Latvia too risky. Serious difficulties were caused by hyperinflation and repeated changes in the national currency. In 1993, it was possible to pay for participation in the marathon in three currencies - locals could pay both in Latvian rubles and newly issued lats, and foreigners - in Deutsche Marks.

The organizers lacked the sponsors and funds to be included in the AIMS international marathon calendar (at the time it would cost $1,000 per year) to attract western marathon tourists. During this time, local runners also became fewer and fewer, and the running culture and, consequently, the interest of sponsors gradually decreased, reaching the lowest point in 1999, when only 53 Latvian runners finished the 42 km distance.

Certified course and new organizers 
In 2007, the track was officially certified and recognized for the first time according to the standards of the International Marathon Association (Association of International Marathons and Distance Races, AIMS).

To increase the number of participants, the Riga Marathon was moved to the spring, attracting school youth to the 5 km distance, however, there were still relatively few runners in the marathon distance and the results could not surpass the performance of the first year.

In 2007, the Riga Marathon got its second wind. After 16 years of work, the original organizer of the marathon, Jānis Karavačiks, entrusted the organization to Aigars Nords, who was full of ambition to turn Riga into a running megalopolis with an ambitious city marathon.

The Riga City Council has entrusted the organization of the marathon to NECom or Nords Event Communications, the new organizers already achieved ambitious growth of the event in the first year. With the help of the new title sponsor Nordea and the slogan "This time for real!" the track was officially certified for the first time following the standards of the International Marathon Association (AIMS). The marathon was included in the international calendar, the usual marathon and 5 km satellite distances were supplemented by a new half-marathon, and the Kenyan Johnston Changwoni broke the Riga Marathon record set in 1991.

Under the auspices of the new organizers, the marathon became one of the fastest-growing and most prestigious running festivals in Northern Europe - from 1300 participants in 2007 to Gold Label gold status and more than 38 thousand participants from 82 countries of the world in 2019.

The long-term partner of the marathon, Rimi, took on the title sponsor duties in 2019, providing support to the Virtual Running Club established during the Covid-19 pandemic, which kept the audience of the event active during the pandemic.

In 2020, due to the coronavirus pandemic, the Latvian Cabinet of Ministers canceled the in-person competition the day before the marathon weekend and moved the marathon to a virtual mode.

But the organizers reached a new peak after the end of the coronavirus pandemic, winning the right to hold the first World Athletics Road Running Championships in Riga (World Athletics Road Running Championships Riga 23) on September 30 - October 1, 2023.

2023 Rimi Riga Marathon, which will be held on 6-7 May, there will be a track rehearsal for the World Championships, allowing runners to try out the World Championship courses.

Course 
The start and finish line of the marathon is set on the  next to Riga Castle.
The marathon course crosses over the Daugava river via the Vanšu, Stone, and Island Bridges, and also includes a section that runs through the cobblestoned streets of Old Riga. 

All of the courses are single-lap courses and are fairly flat and mostly features the center of the city. 

The 33rd edition of Riga Marathon is set to be a rehearsal for the first World Athletics Road Running Championships, which will take place in Riga in 30 September – 1 October. In which the marathon course will be laid out over two laps of the official World Athletics Road Running Championships half marathon course.

Winners 

Key: Course record (in bold)

Marathon

Half marathon

By country 
Note: Marathon and Half Marathon statistics only

Multiple wins 
Note: Marathon and Half Marathon statistics only

Official marathon shirts and medals 
The official shirts of the marathon have been created since the 2008 Riga marathon. Each year, one of Latvia's well-known artists is entrusted with creating a different design for the marathon's official running shirts and medals.

Artists who have created designs for Riga Marathon shirts - Andris Vītoliņš, Ieva Iltnere, Ritums Ivanovs, Elita Patmalniece, Ella Kruļanska, Krišs Salmanis, Ilmārs Blumbergs, Raimonds Staprāns, Anna Heinrihsone, Maija Kurševa, Gustavs Klucis (the 2018 shirt design used the artwork of G. Klucis, which was bought at an auction on November 18, 2017, specially for the Latvian centenary marathon shirt), MARE&ROLS and Jānis Šneiders.

In 2019, the design of the marathon medals was created by Artūrs Analts, the recipient of the main award "Best Design" at the London Design Biennale. The design of the 30th anniversary medals of the marathon was created by the Japanese artist Junichi Kawanishi, who is also the author of the Tokyo Olympic Games medals.

The designs of the 2021 Riga Marathon shirts and medals were created by the head of the painting department of the Art Academy of Latvia, associate professor Kristiāns Brekte.

Historical titles 
During the valuable history of the Riga Marathon, it has been supported by many different Latvian-based and international companies. Until 2006, the name of the marathon was the International Riga Marathon, when the organizational leadership changed, the word "International" was removed from the name.

 1994 - 1996. International Radio SWH Riga Marathon
 2000. International Riga Samsung Marathon
 2003 - 2004. Riga Maxima International Marathon
 2006. Riga Parex marathon
 2007 - 2013. Nordea Riga Marathon
 2014 - 2018 Lattelecom Riga Marathon
 2019. Tet Riga Marathon
 2020 - 2023 Rimi Riga Marathon

Organizers 
Since 2007, the Riga Marathon has been organized by the agency "Nords Event Communications" ("NECom") in cooperation with the Riga City Council.

Notes

References

External links
 Official website of Riga Marathon  
  Riga Marathon Photos 2014

Marathons in Europe
Sports competitions in Riga
Athletics in Latvia
Athletics competitions in Latvia
Recurring sporting events established in 1991
Annual sporting events in Latvia
1991 establishments in Latvia
Spring (season) events in Latvia